Jorge Castro may refer to:

 Jorge Castro (boxer) (born 1967), Argentine boxer
 Jorge Castro (footballer) (born 1990), Costa Rican footballer
 Jorge Castro (athlete), see 2007 NACAC Championships – Results
 Jorge Castro (gymnast), Mexican Olympic gymnast
 Jorge Daniel Castro (born 1950), Colombian police office and business administrator
 Jorge Lara Castro (born 1945), Paraguayan lawyer, sociologist, and diplomat
 Jorge Castro Muñoz (born 1956), Chilean politician and former major of Valparaíso, Chile.

See also
Castro (disambiguation)